William Poy, MM (1907 – 3 February 2002) was an Australian-born Canadian civil servant and businessman of Chinese descent. He served with the Royal Hong Kong Regiment (the Volunteers) during World War II as a Lance Corporal messenger and worked for the Canadian Trade Commission in Hong Kong. He was awarded the Military Medal for his service in Hong Kong.

Life and career
Poy was born in Chiltern, Victoria, Australia to Ah Poy as one of seven children. He left Hong Kong in 1942 and settled in Ottawa, Ontario, with his wife Ethel Poy, a fellow migrant from Guangdong province of Hakka descent and their two children, Adrienne and Neville. His daughter, Adrienne, would later become the Governor General of Canada.

Poy obtained a degree in political science from the University of Ottawa. He continued to work at the trade commission until 1946 and later became a stock broker working in Canada and Hong Kong. Poy established Allied Trading Company in Ottawa after his career with the trade commission.

Poy retired in the mid 1970s and moved to Toronto. Widowed in 1988, he died at a nursing home in 2002. He was survived by two brothers, Lindsay and Roy, in Australia, and other distant relatives in China and Australia. He was predeceased by his brother Leslie.

References

 
 
 

1907 births
2002 deaths
Canadian people of Chinese descent
Australian emigrants to Canada
Canadian chief executives
British colonial army soldiers
Australian people of Chinese descent
Businesspeople from New South Wales
Businesspeople from Ottawa
Businesspeople from Victoria (Australia)
Recipients of the Military Medal
University of Ottawa alumni
Canadian recipients of the Military Medal